John Christopher Brown (August 15, 1961 – December 26, 2006) was an American third baseman in Major League Baseball during the 1980s, most notably with the San Francisco Giants.

Biography

Early life
Born in Jackson, Mississippi, Brown was a graduate of Crenshaw High School in Los Angeles, California, where he played high school baseball with Darryl Strawberry. The 1979 Crenshaw High Cougars baseball team was the subject of Michael Sokolove's The Ticket Out: Darryl Strawberry and the Boys of Crenshaw.

Brown was selected by the Giants in the second round (44th overall) during the 1979 amateur draft.

Professional baseball career

San Francisco Giants
After a steady climb through the Giants minor league system, Brown made his major league debut for them in 1984 as a September call-up. In his first full season in 1985, Brown batted .261 with 16 home runs and 61 runs batted in (RBIs) for the last-place Giants, made the All-Rookie team, and finished fourth in the National League Rookie of the Year voting; Brown also led the NL in times being hit by pitch (11). In 1986, Brown batted .317 and made the NL All-Star team after hitting nearly .350 in the season's first half.  The same season, he was involved in an infamous brawl.

At the end of 1986, he complained of shoulder soreness. That offseason, an examination by Dr. Frank Jobe in Los Angeles discovered that there was indeed a serious problem, and surgery was performed that winter. The following season, with Brown hitting a paltry .242 after 38 games, the Giants sent him packing on July 5 along with Keith Comstock, Mark Davis, and Mark Grant in a midseason trade to the San Diego Padres in exchange for Kevin Mitchell, Dave Dravecky, and Craig Lefferts.

San Diego Padres and Detroit Tigers
Brown's play declined further as the year progressed, and he ended the year with a .237 average; the Giants went on to win the NL West division, and the Padres finished in last place. After dropping to a .235 average in 1988 for San Diego, Brown was dealt to the Detroit Tigers and was out of baseball by 1989 at the age of 28.  In his career he batted .269 with 38 home runs, 184 RBIs, 164 runs, 410 hits and 21 stolen bases in 449 games.

Life after baseball
After retirement, Brown lived in Houston, Texas, with his wife Lisa and their two children, Paris Brown and Gordon Pickett. In 2004, Brown worked in Iraq driving an 18-wheel truck delivering diesel fuel for Halliburton. He took fire on numerous occasions, including in a convoy that was attacked on April 9, 2004, in which six Halliburton drivers and one soldier were killed and another driver kidnapped and later released. By 2006, Brown had returned to the United States.

Brown died at Memorial Hermann Hospital in Houston on December 26, 2006, nearly a month after he suffered burns in a fire at a vacant house he owned in Sugar Land, Texas. He was 45 years of age.

References

External links

 Chris Brown MLB - Baseballbiography.com
 The Baseball Cube - major and minor league statistics
 

1961 births
2006 deaths
Accidental deaths in Texas
African-American baseball players
American expatriate baseball players in Mexico
Baseball players from Jackson, Mississippi
Baseball players from Houston
Baseball players from Los Angeles
Buffalo (minor league baseball) players
Clinton Giants players
Deaths from fire in the United States
Detroit Tigers players
Fresno Giants players
Great Falls Giants players
Indianapolis Indians players
Major League Baseball third basemen
National League All-Stars
Phoenix Giants players
San Diego Padres players
San Francisco Giants players
Shreveport Captains players
People from Crenshaw, Los Angeles
Sultanes de Monterrey players
Crenshaw High School alumni
20th-century African-American sportspeople
21st-century African-American people